Fire Without Flame is a hard rock album by Akira Kajiyama and Joe Lynn Turner. This is the first release under both their names. Fire Without Flame is more of a return to Slam era sensibilities: a blistering blues infused hard rock album, on which Kajiyama handled all instruments and production himself. While absent of song writing credits, it’s assumed that Turner contributed all lyrics and vocal melodies.

Track listing
 "One Day Away" - 4:10
 "Fire Without Flame" - 4:20
 "Carnival of Souls" - 3:44
 "Heart Against Heart" - 6:57
 "End of the Line" - 4:45
 "Forever Changed" - 5:57
 "Bad Feeling" - 4:59
 "Looking for Trouble" - 4:28
 "Down and Dirty" - 4:34
 "License to Kill" - 4:50
 "Slow Burn" - 4:26

Personnel

Akira Kajiyama: Guitar, bass, keyboards
Joe Lynn Turner: Vocals
Toshyo Egawa: Keyboards

External links
 http://www.rockeyez.com

2006 albums
Joe Lynn Turner albums